Ikumi Oeda (born 1 June 1993) is a Thai judoka. She won the gold medal in the women's 78 kg event at the 2019 Southeast Asian Games held in the Philippines.

She won one of the bronze medals in the women's 78 kg event at the 2018 Asian Games held in Jakarta, Indonesia. She also competed in the women's 78 kg event at the 2019 World Judo Championships and the same event at the 2021 World Judo Championships.

References

External links 
 

Living people
1993 births
Place of birth missing (living people)
Ikumi Oeda
Judoka at the 2018 Asian Games
Medalists at the 2018 Asian Games
Asian Games medalists in judo
Ikumi Oeda
Ikumi Oeda
Ikumi Oeda
Southeast Asian Games medalists in judo
Competitors at the 2019 Southeast Asian Games
Ikumi Oeda
Ikumi Oeda